The 1904–05 season was the 11th in the history of Southern League. Bristol Rovers won Division One for the first time and Fulham reserves finished top of Division Two. Division Two club Clapton Orient were the only Southern League club to apply for election to the Football League, and were successful after a decision was made to expand the League to 40 clubs.

Division One

A total of 18 teams contest the division, including 17 sides from previous season and one new team. Watford returned to Division after one season of absence.

Teams promoted from Division Two:
 Watford

Division Two

A total of 12 teams contest the division, including 8 sides from previous season and four new teams, three of which were reserve teams.

Newly elected teams:
 Clapton Orient
 Brighton & Hove Albion II
 Watford II
 West Ham United II,

Football League elections
Only one Southern League club, Clapton Orient of Division Two, applied for election to Division Two of the Football League. Although they were not elected in the first round, it was later agreed to expand the
Football League from 36 to 40 clubs and all the unsuccessful candidates except Doncaster Rovers were elected.

* Chelsea had played no games, nor had any players when they were elected. Hull City had been formed in 1904, but had only played friendly matches during the 1904–05 season.

References

External links 
Southern League First Division Tables at RSSSF
Southern League Second Division Tables at RSSSF

1904-05
1904–05 in English association football leagues